Stephen Richards is an author writing in the self-help genre. The first book he wrote in 1998 was in the true crime genre for Mirage Publishing. He has co-written a number of books with others, but now concentrates on writing in the mind, body, spirit subjects of Cosmic Ordering and mind power.

The best known works of Stephen Richards are probably The Cosmic Ordering Guide. and the co-authored book of Solitary Fitness. He has also worked on TV and radio. 

He produced and directed the three-hour video documentary Sincerely Yours about UK prisoner Charles Bronson. In 2000, the then Home Secretary Jack Straw was granted an injunction banning the release of Sincerely Yours, on the grounds that it included footage of Bronson terrorizing a hostage in prison, whose copyright was owned by the prison, according to Straw . Having refused to withdraw the video saw Richards given a prison sentence (suspended) and he had to incur court costs of £64,000. The video was later released in an edited version by Mirage Publishing, but was later totally withdrawn for what Richards claimed were personal reasons.

Writing true crime books as an investigative journalist for Blake Publishing from early 2000 to 2006 saw him change from writing about the perpetrator to the victim of crime. His crime writing came to an end when he moved away from this genre, citing the way crime was being glamorised and how the victim was neglected.

From 2006 he restarted Mirage Publishing and turned his back on true crime writing, vowing never again to write in this genre, totally concentrating on writing mind, body and spirit 
books and publishing new authors.

His professional background is in clinical hypnotherapy and stress counselling. He was previously a member of the British Association of Counsellors and was affiliated to their Family Sexual Division, Disaster Team and Stress Counselling for Students Division.

He currently applies his time to self-help publications, running his property development empire, and helping others.

Bibliography

- Total pages: 200
- Total pages: 249
- Total pages: 339
 - Total pages: 78
 - Total pages: 248
 - Total pages:100
- Total pages: 208
- Total pages: 2.5 hours
 - Total pages: 200
- Total pages: 300
 - Total pages: 220
- Total pages: 300
 - Total pages: 335
- Total pages: 555
 - Total pages: 324
 - Total pages:214
 - Total pages: 288
 - Total pages: 307
 - Total pages: 278
 - Total pages: 335
 - Total pages: 288
 - Total pages: 288
 - Total pages: 288
 - Total pages: 288
- Total pages: 288
- Total pages: 256
 - Total pages: 288
 - Total pages: 288
 - Total pages: 288
- Total pages: 288
- Total pages: 192
 - Total pages: 288
 - Total pages: 291
 - Total pages: 288
 - Total pages: 288
 - Total pages: 288
 - Total pages: 262
 - Total pages: 288
 - Total pages: 288
 - Total pages: 288
- Total pages: 60
- Total pages: 178
 - Total pages: 288
 - Total pages: 288
- Total pages: 67
- Total pages: 47
 - Total pages: 288
 - Total pages: 288
 - Total pages: 262
- Total pages: 390
- Total pages: 222
 - Total pages: 288
- Total pages: 150
 - Total pages: 288
- Total pages: 220
- Total pages: 125
- Total pages: 37
 - Total pages: 288
- Total pages: 114
- Total pages: 156
- Total pages: 20
- Total pages: 77
- Total pages: 143
- Total pages: 221
- Total pages: 211
- Total pages: 224
 - Total pages: 288
- Total pages: 155
 - Total pages: 316
- Total pages: 176
- Total pages: 268
 - Total pages: 332
 - Total pages: 250
 - Total pages: 304
 - Total pages: 308
 - Total pages: 278
 - Total pages: 268
 - Total pages: 266
 - Total pages: 335
 - Total pages: 352
 - Total pages: 305
 - Total pages: 288

References

External links
 Homepage (archived version from 2016)

British self-help writers
Living people
Year of birth missing (living people)